Gongju station is a station on South Korea's Honam High Speed Railway.

See also 
 Korea Train Express

References

External links
Korea Railroad Corp. website 
Booking Korail rail tickets

Railway stations in South Chungcheong Province
Gongju
Railway stations opened in 2015
Korea Train Express stations
2015 establishments in South Korea